Colossians 4 is the fourth (and last) chapter of the Epistle to the Colossians in the New Testament of the Christian Bible. Traditionally, it is believed to have been written for the churches in Colossae and Laodicea (see ) by Apostle Paul, with Timothy as his co-author, while he was in prison in Ephesus (years 53–54), although there are debatable claims that it is the work of a secondary imitator, or that it was written in Rome (in the early 60s). This chapter contains the final exhortations and greetings.

Text
The original text was written in Koine Greek. This chapter is divided into 18 verses.

Textual witnesses
Some early manuscripts containing the text of this chapter are:
Papyrus 46 (c. AD 200)
Codex Vaticanus (325-350)
Codex Sinaiticus (330-360)
Codex Alexandrinus (400-440)
Codex Ephraemi Rescriptus (c. 450; complete)
Codex Freerianus (c. 450; extant verses 1–2, 11–13)
Codex Claromontanus (c. 550)

Exhortations for masters

Verse 1
 Masters, give your bondservants what is just and fair, knowing that you also have a Master in heaven.
Verse 4:1, addressed to "masters", concludes the exhortation to servants in verses 22-25 of the previous chapter.

Concluding Exhortations (4:2–6)

Verse 6
 Let your speech always be with grace, seasoned with salt, that you may know how you ought to answer each one.

 "Let your speech be always with grace": that is, "in grace, or concerning grace"; let 'grace', such as 'the work of grace on souls', 'the wonders of grace' and 'the glory of the grace of God', be the subject of conversation among believers. Moreover, the speech should be in a 'graceful way', that is, "always" with a cheerful face and in a courteous manner.
 "Seasoned with salt": The Syriac version reads, "as if it was seasoned with salt". 'Grace' to 'speech' is as 'salt' to 'meat'; therefore "grace, prudence, and holiness", as 'salt', make conversation about the grace and doctrines of God more acceptable to a spiritual man; and as salt preserves flesh from being bad, so grace along with speech makes it pure and good, which corresponds to Paul's view that nothing corrupt should proceed out of the mouths of believers.
 "How you ought to answer": The Syriac and Arabic versions render it, "and know ye how" and make it to be a fresh exhortation to the believers to share the spiritual knowledge, that they may be able to respond properly and pertinently, with meekness and fear, for those asking a reason of the hope that is in them.

Final Greetings (4:7–18)

In the beginning of the final greetings, Paul introduces the bearers of this epistle – Tychicus and Onesimus – in a 'chiastic pattern' (verses 7–9). Six men who were with Paul at that time, excluding Timothy (the co-author of this letter), sent their greetings; five of these ('Jesus who is called Justus' is the exception) also sent their greetings to Philemon in a separate epistle.

Verses 10–11
Aristarchus my fellow prisoner greets you, with Mark the cousin of Barnabas (about whom you received instructions: if he comes to you, welcome him), and Jesus who is called Justus. These are my only fellow workers for the kingdom of God who are of the circumcision; they have proved to be a comfort to me.
"Aristarchus": is known from some references in the Acts of the Apostles (19:29; 20:4; 27:2).
"Who are of the circumcision": denoting the "Christians of Jewish origin".

Verse 12
 Epaphras, who is one of you, a bondservant of Christ, greets you, always laboring fervently for you in prayers, that you may stand perfect and complete in all the will of God.
"Epaphras": Paul's co-worker, a native of Colossae.

Verse 13
 For I bear him witness that he has a great zeal for you, and those who are in Laodicea, and those in Hierapolis. 
 "Laodicea and ... Hierapolis": two neighboring cities of Colossae in the Lycus valley of Western Anatolia (Asia Minor, now Turkey), in the land of Phrygia. A population of 11,000 Jewish males is estimated to be in Laodicea in Paul's day, since Antiochus III placed a large colony of Jews in that area in 200 BC.

Verse 14
Luke the beloved physician and Demas greet you.
Only from this verse Luke is known to be a doctor and based on the separation from the Jewish Christians mentioned in verse 11, he is identified as a "Gentile Christian". It is noted in 2 Timothy 4:10 that Demas has left Paul for "this world".

Verse 18
 This salutation by my own hand—Paul. Remember my chains. Grace be with you. Amen.
"By my own hand—Paul": Paul is known to regularly use amanuensis (secretaries) to write his letters (cf. Romans 16:22), so to authenticate these letters, he put his own handwriting in this last paragraph (cf. ; ;).

See also

 Related Bible parts: Matthew 23, Acts 15, Galatians 1, Ephesians 4, Philemon 1

References

Sources

External links
 King James Bible - Wikisource
English Translation with Parallel Latin Vulgate
Online Bible at GospelHall.org (ESV, KJV, Darby, American Standard Version, Bible in Basic English)
Multiple bible versions at Bible Gateway (NKJV, NIV, NRSV etc.)

04